Eveline Novakovic (née Fischer) (born 1969 in Christchurch, Hampshire) is a British video game music composer who composed some of the music for Donkey Kong Country, most of the tracks for Donkey Kong Country 3: Dixie Kong's Double Trouble!, and did voice acting and sound effects for a number of other Rare games including the voice of the main heroine, Joanna Dark, in the Nintendo 64 game Perfect Dark. She left the company after doing voice work for Kameo.

Often credited by the name E. Fischer in earlier games she worked on, she married and adopted the name Novakovic in the early 2000s.

Video game credits

Music/sound

Voice acting

See also
 DK Jamz

Notes

External links
 
 Profile at MobyGames
 
 Composer profile at OverClocked ReMix

1969 births
British composers
British women composers
Living people
Rare (company) people
Video game composers